Michael Albert Meyer (born 1937) is a German-born American historian of modern Jewish history. He taught for over 50 years at the Hebrew Union College-Jewish Institute of Religion in Cincinnati, Ohio.  He is currently the Adolph S. Ochs Emeritus Professor of Jewish History at that institution.  He was one of the founders of the Association for Jewish Studies, and served as its president from 1978–80.  He also served as International President of the Leo Baeck Institute from 1992–2013.  He has published many books and articles, most notably on the history of German Jews, the origins and history of the Reform movement in Judaism, and Jewish people and faith confronting modernity.  He is a three-time National Jewish Book Award winner.

Life and education 
Meyer was born in Berlin and lived with his family there until their escape from Nazi Germany in the summer of 1941. 

In Germany, his father was an attorney, who subsequently had his law license revoked by the Nazis and spent time in forced labor before managing to take his family to the United States via Spain.

Meyer grew up in Los Angeles, California, graduated with highest honors from UCLA and received his PhD in Jewish history from the Hebrew Union College (HUC).  Upon graduation, in 1964, the then-President of HUC, Nelson Glueck, recruited Meyer to join the faculty.  Meyer taught there  for his entire career, starting in Los Angeles, before moving to the Cincinnati campus in 1967.  He has also taught repeatedly over the years at HUC's campus in Jerusalem.

Meyer has also been affiliated with the Hebrew University Institute for Advanced Studies, the University of Pennsylvania, the Be'er Sheva University (now the Ben Gurion University of the Negev), Antioch College and the University of Haifa.

Meyer's son is United States government official Jonathan Meyer, 6th General Counsel of the United States Department of Homeland Security.

Scholarship 
After completing his doctoral dissertation, Meyer published it under the title The Origins of the Modern Jew: Jewish Identity and European Culture in Germany, 1749–1824 (1967).  The book won the National Jewish Book Award for Jewish thought in 1968 and has been continuously in print for over 50 years.

Other notable books include Response to Modernity:  A History of the Reform Movement in Judaism (1988);  National Jewish Book Award winner in Jewish Thought, 1989 Jewish Identity in the Modern World (1990); and a collection of essays entitled Judaism Within Modernity (2001).  In 2020, he published a biography of the prominent German Jewish rabbi, Leo Baeck, which was a finalist for the National Jewish Book Award in the category of Biography.  https://huc.edu/news/huc-faculty-receive-2020-national-jewish-book-awards-by-jewish-book-council/.

Meyer is also a renowned editor of Jewish history. Volumes he has edited include Ideas of Jewish History (1974); a four-volume German-Jewish History in Modern Times (1996–1998, with Assistant Editor Michael Brenner); and Joachim Prinz, Rebellious Rabbi: An Autobiography--the German and Early American Years (2007).

A prolific author, Meyer has authored over 100 academic articles and over 250 book reviews during his career.

From 2014–2015, Meyer worked on his project "Dispersion–Diversion: Consequences of the Migration of Jewish Studies from Germany to America" through a fellowship at the Katz Center for Advanced Judaic Studies.

In 2020, Meyer published a scholarly biography of Rabbi Leo Baeck with University of Pennsylvania Press.

Selected awards and honors 
 National Jewish Book Award in the Jewish Thought category - 1968 (The Origins of the Modern Jew: Jewish Identity and European Culture in Germany, 1749-1824)
 National Jewish Book Award in Jewish History – 1989 (Response to Modernity:  A History of the Reform Movement in Judaism)
 National Foundation for Jewish Culture's Scholarship Award in Historical Studies – 1996
 National Jewish Book Award in Jewish History – 1997 (German-Jewish history in modern times, volume 2 : Emancipation and  acculturation, 1780–1871)
 Member, Ne'eman Commission on Jewish Religious Pluralism in Israel – 1997
 Honorary Doctor of Hebrew Letters degree from the Jewish Theological Seminary of America – 2001
 Moses Mendelssohn Award of the Leo Baeck Institute – 2015

In 2008, a group of scholars from around the world honored Meyer with a Festschrift, or jubilee volume, edited by Lauren B. Strauss and Michael Brenner, entitled Mediating Modernity:  Challenges and Trends in the Jewish Encounter with the Modern World.

Selected publications

Books 
 
 
 Response to Modernity: A History of the Reform Movement in Judaism. Oxford: Oxford University Press.  1988.  .
 
 
 Judaism Within Modernity: Essays on Jewish History and Religion. Detroit: Wayne State University Press, 2001.  .

Articles 

 "Where Does the Modern Period of Jewish History Begin?"  Judaism Vol. 24 No. 3 (Summer 1975) pp. 329–338.
 "The Emergence of Jewish Historiography: Motives and Motifs" History and Theory Vol. 27 No. 4 (December 1988) pp. 160–175.

References 

1937 births
Living people
Hebrew Union College – Jewish Institute of Religion faculty
Historians of Jews and Judaism
Leo Baeck Institute
Jewish emigrants from Nazi Germany to the United States
People from Los Angeles
University of California, Los Angeles alumni